The AIC Serie A Italian Footballer of the Year was a yearly award organized by the Italian Footballers' Association (AIC) given to the Italian footballer who was considered to have performed the best over the previous Serie A season. The award was part of the Oscar del Calcio awards event.

Winners

By club

By position

See also
Serie A Footballer of the Year

Notes

References

External links
 List of Oscar del Calcio winners on the AIC official website

Serie A trophies and awards
Oscar del Calcio
Awards established in 1997
1997 establishments in Italy
Annual events in Italy
Lists of Italian sportspeople
Ital
Association football player non-biographical articles